William Edward Ryder-Jones (born 10 August 1983) is an English singer-songwriter, musician, music producer and composer from West Kirby, Merseyside. He co-founded the band The Coral, together with James Skelly, Lee Southall, Paul Duffy, and Ian Skelly, playing as their lead guitarist from 1996 until 2008. He has since pursued a solo career, writing both his own albums and film scores, as well as producing records for other artists and appearing as a session musician.

Ryder-Jones' debut album, If..., an instrumental concept album featuring the Royal Liverpool Philharmonic, serving as an imaginary film score for the Italo Calvino novel, If on a Winter's Night a Traveler..., was released in 2011. His second album, A Bad Wind Blows in My Heart was released in 2013, again to positive reviews. His third, West Kirby County Primary, was released in November 2015. Both are departures from the orchestral nature of If..., the former featuring a more traditional collection of minimal folk songs, and the latter being a heavier, more alternative folk rock album.

The Coral

Ryder-Jones was the lead guitarist with The Coral and played on the band's first five albums. In 2005, he briefly stopped touring with the band due to a stress-related illness. It was announced on 9 January 2008 that Ryder-Jones had left The Coral and the remaining five members would continue with the band.

Early solo work and If... (2009–2011)
Following his departure from The Coral, Ryder-Jones began writing songs and instrumental pieces and uploaded several demo recordings to his MySpace profile. In 2009, Ryder-Jones composed the score for his friend's short film Leave Taking, directed by Laurence Easeman. The four compositions were released on his debut EP A Leave Taking Soundtrack as a free download in July 2011 by Double Six Records (a subsidiary of Domino Recording Company) via their website and a music video was filmed for the title track "A Leave Taking". The EP was also released on 12-inch and digital download formats on 26 September 2011. Ryder-Jones also composed the scores for the short films It's Natural to Be Afraid (2010) and Bed (2011).

Ryder-Jones' debut solo album If... was written as a musical adaptation of Italo Calvino's 1979 novel If on a Winter's Night a Traveler, with each composition representing a different chapter in the book. The idea for the album was first conceived after a meeting with Laurence Bell, the head of Domino Records, who had suggested Ryder-Jones record an "imaginary film score". Recording sessions for If... took place during 2010 at various locations on Merseyside, including Elevator Studios, the Scandinavian Church of Liverpool, The Friary in Everton and Ryder-Jones' mother's house in West Kirby. Most of the album's tracks were recorded with the Royal Liverpool Philharmonic orchestra. Ryder-Jones' musical influences for the album came from film score composers such as Abel Korzeniowski, Michael Galasso and Clint Mansell and rock artists such as Syd Barrett, Nick Cave and Gorky's Zygotic Mynci. If... was released on 14 November 2011 and received largely positive reviews from music critics.

A Bad Wind Blows in My Heart, scrapped third album, and West Kirby County Primary (2012–2018)
On 29 April 2013, the soundtrack to the 2012 film Piggy was self-released by Ryder-Jones on Bandcamp, with proceeds going to the Trekstock charity.

Ryder-Jones' second and third albums, A Bad Wind Blows in My Heart, released 2013, and West Kirby County Primary, released 2015, are both a departure from If...'''s orchestral nature. They do, however, retain the concept album theme (both albums focus around Ryder-Jones' life). A Bad Wind Blows in My Heart is a collection of folk and folk rock songs, influenced by Ryder-Jones' love of Bill Callahan as well as various other minimal and folk artists. West Kirby County Primary is a heavy, alternative and folk rock album, influenced by bands such as Gorky's Zygotic Mynci, Super Furry Animals, The Strokes and Pavement. It was recorded with friends, adding to the band-theme Ryder-Jones was trying to capture. The track Wild Roses  was co-written by Ryder-Jones and friends Emma Leatherbarrow (of MiNNETONKA) and Liam Power (of By the Sea); Ryder-Jones claims to have only written the chorus. "Seabirds" was co-written by Ryder-Jones and Leatherbarrow. Half of the album was written at Ryder-Jones' home, before continuing to work on the material at his home studio, located in his old bedroom in his mother's house, and at Parr St. Studios in Liverpool.

In an interview with BBC Radio 6 Music, Ryder-Jones stated that he had chosen to scrap an album's worth of material after being unsatisfied with the result. He said, "I wasn't writing things that were making me happy in the moment. I got lost a little bit in why I was doing it and as a result wasn't living in the most responsible way. So the record I made during that time, thankfully, Domino were kind enough to let me drop. Some of the things that had happened to me though during the making of that record, the one I eventually dropped, turned out to be interesting enough to make good songs out of!"

Ryder-Jones embarked on a ten-date tour of England and Scotland from 24 October to 14 November 2015 to celebrate the release of West Kirby County Primary. The first five dates were in support of Spector. He continued to tour into 2015, including various festival dates. He will conclude the album's tour cycle with a final leg in late 2016, playing six UK dates. The 'Ta-Tah Tour' will feature support from By the Sea, MiNNETONKA and Matt Maltese.

Yawn and Yawny Yawn (2018–present)
Ryder-Jones released the album "Yawn " on 2 November 2018 and after this, his latest album "Yawny Yawn " on 26 July 2019. "Yawny Yawn " is an acoustic reworking of his previous album "Yawn " and features the same songs, just with different instrumentation. Both albums have been critically acclaimed and Ryder-Jones finished a tour of the "Yawny Yawn " album in November 2019.

Musical style and influences
Ryder-Jones has said that the sound of all three albums of his albums have been heavily influenced by the music he was listening to, and was interested in at the time of writing and recording. He stated in an interview with BBC Radio 6 Music that when making If.., he'd been "obsessed with classical music for a year-and-a-half", while when he was making West Kirby County Primary, he'd "started to enjoy heavier music". He has previously confessed admiration for Bill Callahan, suggesting that he heavily influenced the sound of A Bad Wind Blows in My Heart.

Collaborations
Ryder-Jones has recorded guitar for other artists such as The Last Shadow Puppets on "Gas Dance" (b-side of "Standing Next to Me"), Arctic Monkeys on "Fireside" and Alex Turner on the Submarine EP. In 2011, he collaborated with Graham Coxon and Paloma Faith on the song "Desire", which was released online by Converse. He has also been a guest guitarist and keyboardist on Arctic Monkeys' AM Tour.

Ryder-Jones has co-produced many albums with other artists. These include co-producing The Wytches's debut album Annabel Dream Reader with the band's frontman Kristian Bell, released in August 2014. and Hooton Tennis Club's debut album Highest Point in Clifftown, released in August 2015. In 2014 Ryder-Jones also co-produced the album Endless Days Crystal Sky for the neo-post-punk band By the Sea. More recently, he has produced Our Girl's album Stranger Today, released in August 2018, and Brooke Bentham's album Everyday Nothing'', released in February 2020.

Discography

Studio albums

Extended plays

Film scores

References

External links
 Domino Records page
 
 
 

1983 births
Double Six Records artists
English film score composers
English male film score composers
English folk guitarists
English male guitarists
English multi-instrumentalists
English songwriters
Living people
Musicians from Merseyside
People from West Kirby
21st-century British guitarists
21st-century British male musicians
British male songwriters